Do Not Part with Your Beloved or  is a Soviet romantic drama, directed by Pavel Arsenov in 1980. The film is based on the eponymous play written in 1971 by Alexander Volodin. The picture was remade in 2014 as Another Year by director Oksana Bychkova.

Plot
Divorce proceedings is the last and the most difficult act in the life of any family. In a civil court there is a continuous bustle: for various reasons people who have recently loved each other and who have built their lives together, are forced to prove and explain to the judge that nothing binds them together anymore. Family life, with all its joys and sorrows, is put on public display and for discussion which is always agonizingly painful and embarrassing ...

Young spouses Mitya and Katya are participants in one of the tragic stories. Katya provokes a fierce jealousy from Mitya's side for sleeping over at her classmate Vadim's place. Mitya torments himself, his wife and Vadim, he endlessly asks the same question - did Katya cheat on him or not?

After a series of endless scandals, Katya and Mitya get divorced. But attempts to settle their lives individually lead to nothing. Despite the parting they continue to love each other ardently, although pride does not allow Katya or Mitya to take the first step forward. The finale of the story remains open: Katya is admitted to a psychiatric hospital for experiencing a nervous breakdown, during Mitya's visit she gets into a hysterical fit, and while sobbing she cries of her love in the arms of her ex-husband ...

Cast
 Aleksandr Abdulov – Mitya Lavrov
 Irina Alfyorova – Katya Lavrova
 Lyudmila Drebneva – Irina, Mitya's girlfriend
 Rufina Nifontova – judge
 Boris Shcherbakov – Vadim, photographer, Katya's classmate 
 Yevgeniy Yevstigneyev – Homak, Vadim's neighbor
 Georgi Margvelashvili – Dato Kirilashvili, divorcing husband
 Valentina Grushina – Larisa Kirilashvili, divorcing wife
 Klara Luchko – Larisa's mother
 Aleksandr Porokhovshchikov – Nikulin, divorcing husband
 Yekaterina Vasilyeva – Nikulina, divorcing wife with son
 Sergei Nikonenko – Shumilov, drunkard, divorcing husband
 Ekaterina Voronina – Shumilova, divorcing wife
 Yuriy Nazarov – Mironov, divorcing husband
 Larisa Luzhina – Mironova, divorcing wife
 Georgi Yepifantsev – Belov, divorcing husband
 Lyubov Polekhina – Belova, wife refusing to divorce her husband

References

External links

1980 films
1980 romantic drama films
Soviet romantic drama films
1980s Russian-language films
Gorky Film Studio films

Films about divorce
Films set in psychiatric hospitals